Petropavlovka is a rural locality (a village) in Denisovsky Selsoviet, Meleuzovsky District, Bashkortostan, Russia. The population was 209 as of 2010. There is 1 street.

Geography 
Petropavlovka is located 28 km northwest of Meleuz (the district's administrative centre) by road. Novaya Kazankovka is the nearest rural locality.

References 

Rural localities in Meleuzovsky District